Georges Marcel Lecointe (6 August 1897 – 4 January 1932) was a French rower who competed in the 1924 Summer Olympics. In 1924 he won the silver medal as member of the French boat in the coxed four event.

References

External links
Georges Lecointe's profile at databaseOlympics

1897 births
1932 deaths
French male rowers
Olympic rowers of France
Olympic silver medalists for France
Rowers at the 1924 Summer Olympics
Olympic medalists in rowing
Medalists at the 1924 Summer Olympics
20th-century French people